Callevophthalmus is a genus of Australian cribellate araneomorph spiders in the family Dictynidae, and was first described by Eugène Simon in 1906.  it contains only two species: C. albus and C. maculatus. Originally placed in the Amaurobiidae, it was moved to the Dictynidae in 1967.

References

Araneomorphae genera
Dictynidae
Spiders of Australia
Taxa named by Eugène Simon